Gilles Street is a street in the south-eastern sector of the centre of Adelaide, South Australia. It runs east–west between East Terrace and King William Street, crossing Hutt Street and Pulteney Street. It was named after Osmond Gilles, an early treasurer of the colony of South Australia on 23 May 1837.

Gilles Street runs from King William Street to East Terrace.

Junction list

See also

Gilles Street Primary School

References

Streets in Adelaide